Václav Čevona (24 May 1922 – 9 January 2008) was a Slovak middle-distance runner. He competed in the 1500 metres at the 1948 Summer Olympics and the 1952 Summer Olympics.

References

1922 births
2008 deaths
Athletes (track and field) at the 1948 Summer Olympics
Athletes (track and field) at the 1952 Summer Olympics
Slovak male middle-distance runners
Olympic athletes of Czechoslovakia
Sportspeople from Ružomberok